The Biblists, also known as the Bibleitzy and the Spiritual-Bible Brotherhood were a sect of Jewish religious reformers in late 19th-century Russia. The group advocated for radical reform of Jewish economic life, a rejection of the Talmud and other post-Biblical authorities, and the abolition of ritual observances in Judaism.

History

The sect emerged around 1880 among the Jewish working classes of Yelisavetgrad, South Russia, under the leadership of Jacob Gordin, in response to a wave of pogroms in the area. 

The founders of the Brotherhood believed that anti-Semitism was rooted in the historical role of the Jews in Poland and Ukraine and supported by their religious separateness. Influenced by both Narodnik and Stundist ideals, Gordin and his adherents maintained that a resolution of the Jewish question will be possible only when the Jews not only give up their religious exclusivity and national identity, but also their former occupations and engage exclusively in 'productive' work. To this end, the Biblists did way with dogmatic theology and all fast days, holidays, and religious ceremonies, including brit milahs, marriage, and even prayer. Only the Tanakh was regarded as the source of faith, with complete freedom in its interpretation, according to the spirit of the age and the findings of science. Members of the Brotherhood were also required to engage in physical labour, especially farming.

The group's activities aroused consternation in the local Jewish press and community; on 16 June 1884, a group of Jews, including parents of the young people who had been attracted to the sect, attacked the Bratstvo meeting place. Particular outrage was caused by inflammatory letters published by Gordin outlining the dissident group's views:

After a long effort, Gordin succeeded in having the sect officially legalized on 12 January 1885; he was permitted to establish a synagogue or a prayer school, and to elect his own rabbi. (Other points of his petition, such as permission for the brotherhood to acquire land, and to establish Jewish agricultural communities, were not granted.) At this time, the Bratstvo numbered about fifty adherents in Yelisavetgrad, and a few smaller groups in Odessa, Nikolayev, Uman, and elsewhere. On 8 December 1888 the Ministry of Justice agreed to the Brotherhood's request to establish its own birth registry, separate from other Yelisavetgrad Jews.

Nonetheless, the local government soon began to look upon the group with disfavour, and Gordin fled the country in July 1891. The police finally disbanded the Bratstvo on 30 September 1891.

See also
 Am Olam
 Jewish agricultural colonies in the Russian Empire
 Stundists

References
 

1880s establishments in the Russian Empire
1890s disestablishments in the Russian Empire
Defunct Jewish organizations
Jewish agricultural colonies in the Russian Empire
Jewish movements
Rural community development
Karaite Judaism
1880s in Judaism